Dalešice is a market town in Třebíč District in the Vysočina Region of the Czech Republic. It has about 600 inhabitants.

Geography

It lies in the Jevišovice Uplands.

Dalešice gave its name to the Dalešice Reservoir. Part of the reservoir forms the eastern border of the municipality.

History
The first written mention of Dalešice is from 1101, when Duke Litolt donated the village to the newly established Benedictine monastery in Třebíč.

Economy
Dalešice is known for the Dalešice Brewery. The tradition of brewing beer dates back to the 17th century.

Sights
The Church of Saints Peter and Paul is a Romanesque-Gothic building from the 12th century. Next to the church is a one-storey Baroque castle with valuable sculptural decoration. it includes the adjacent castle park.

The brewery houses the Museum of Austro-Hungarian Brewing and offers tours of the operation.

In popular culture
The film Cutting It Short was shot in the brewery.

References

External links

Populated places in Třebíč District
Market towns in the Czech Republic